The Golden Reel Award for Outstanding Achievement in Sound Editing – Sound Effects, Foley, Music, Dialogue and ADR for Short Form Animation Broadcast Media is an annual award given by the Motion Picture Sound Editors. It honors sound editors whose work has warranted merit in the field of television; in this case, their work in the field of sound effects and foley work in short form animated broadcast media.

Three categories once were presented to reward sound editing in short form animated broadcast media, in 1997, Best Sound Editing - Television Animated Specials was presented, the same year, Best Sound Editing - Television Animation - Music and Best Sound Editing - Television Animation - Sound became stables categories with the former being presented until 2003 and the latter becoming the current category, being renamed in 2007.

Winners and nominees

1990s

2000s

2010s

2020s

References

Golden Reel Awards (Motion Picture Sound Editors)